Gangolli (also Ganguli) is a village in Kundapur Taluk of Udupi district in Karnataka state. It is situated at the estuary of the Panchagangavalli River. It is located on a peninsula on the west coast of Karnataka. It is bordered by the river to the east and by the Arabian Sea to the west.

The town was originally spelt as "Ganguli", but is now more commonly spelled as "Gangolli".  The postal seal however still uses the old spelling.

Location 
Gangolli is situated at the mouth of an estuary where 5 rivers, Souparnika River, Varahi River, Kedaka River, Chakra River, and Kubja River, together called "Panchagangavali" meet. The local Kannada versions of those river names are Kollooru hole, Haladi hole, Rajadi hole, Vandse hole and Hemmadi hole.

History 
During the turmoil in the Vijayanagar Empire following its defeat at the Battle of Tallikota in 1565, Gangolli came under the rule of the Nayakas of Keladi from Keladi who until then were vassals/chieftains of Vijayanagara but seized the opportunity to break away and declare independence as the Bednore Kingdom. The population and activity around Gangolli at the time was scanty as most of the surrounding area continued to be densely forested. The people living in and around Gangolli were predominantly Veerashaivas, Jains and their occupations being agriculture and fishing. Basrur, further inland from Gangolli was a more prominent place being mentioned even in the writings of 13th century traveller Ibn Battuta.

Around 1560, a large number of Portuguese & Goan Catholic families migrated to Gangolli and further south. These affluent migrants purchased large portions of land from individual residents and also directly from the Keladi Vassal Sadashiva Nayaka under whose patronage they cleared forested areas to accommodate themselves. Their purposes were to build homes, pursue agriculture and to continue trade. Their pioneering contribution to the development of the region was quick in coming as they resumed their old trade now from a new base in Gangolli and Basrur (referred to then as Barcelor) making Gangolli into a prime maritime location at the time.

The patronage provided by the Keladi Nayakas to the Christian immigrants was not appreciated by the over-zealous Goa Inquisition focused Portuguese administration in Goa at the time. However, in and around Gangolli the relationship and inter-dependence between the local rulers and their new enterprising subjects was deepening by the day especially after the Keladi Nayaks staked claim to independence in 1565. Many of the gun wielding, horse trading/riding men joined as mercenaries to fight alongside Keladi armies, offered services on trading & tax collecting ships or trained the armies of the Keladi Nayaks on the use of firearms and open-sea warfare. It will be interesting to note that in subsequent years Christian persons in the area would be addressed as 'Nayak' or 'Naik' and this tradition continues to this day. It is believed that the first church in South Kanara came up on the Gangolli Bunder around 1560 which was in effect just a prayer hall without a tabernacle as there was no priest around there at the time.

Aware of Gangolli's rapid development in recent times, during the reign of Virabhadra Nayaka(1629–1645) the Portuguese captured Gangolli in 1629 under the command of Miguel de Noronha, 4th Count of Linhares. He built a fort at the mouth of the estuary in Gangolli and dedicated it to St. Michael (Michael (archangel)). He also commissioned the building of a small but proper church dedicated to the Immaculate Conception. Upon the completion of this church in 1630, the old prayer hall on the Bunder was razed to the ground and the new church was re-dedicated to Our Lady of the Immaculate Conception.

Shivappa Nayaka ascended the throne in 1645 after Virabhadra. He ran several campaigns to regain territories lost over the years. By the year 1654 he managed to push the Portuguese back and reclaim now a fortified Gangolli and Honnavar then also called Onore. Shivappa in his fury also ordered that the small Church building built by them in 1630 be destroyed. This act literally undid the kingdom as instability hit the Keladi Nayaka dynasty. Within the next 3 years, Shivappa's 15-year reign came to an abrupt end in 1660. In the following 12 years, 3 rulers came and went as the dynasty began to crumble - Chikka Venkatappa Nayaka (1660–1662), Bhadrappa Nayaka (1662–1664) & Somashekara Nayaka I (1664–1672).

Muscat was traditionally one of the main Arab ports trading with the entire west coast of India. A Muscat port log of 1672 reveals that Muscat has 16 ships that came in from Sind, 4 from the Malabar, 4 from the Makran Coast, 1 from Karwar, 2 from Patan, 2 from Pate, 14 from Konkani Ports, 2 from Mocha, 2 from Surat & Broach, 2 from Maldives, 16 from Kung and the highest - 27 from Bhatkal, Barcelor (Basrur via Gangolli) & Mangalore.

In 1672, the widow of Somashekara Nayaka, Keladi Chennamma (also referred to as Chenammajji or Chennammarani) took over the dynasty after the death of her husband. While the financial gains of the kingdom bloomed, the personal losses with rapid successive deaths of its rulers was going unchecked. In a move to ward off the misfortune that had befallen the dynasty, she was advised by her ministers to immediately facilitate the reconstruction of the Church destroyed by Shivappa Nayaka. Without a delay, she donated land and urged the Christians to rebuild the Church. Almost miraculously then, the tide turned. The dynasty stabilized and her rule continued unhindered thereafter for the next 12 years and the Keladi Dynasty continued until it was among the last to lose autonomy to the Mysore Rulers in 1757 and then subsequently to the British.

On one occasion in 1697 however, a fleet of Arabs from Muscat went on a rampage damaging temples and sacking areas from Gangolli, Kundapur to Basrur when they were refused royal permission to set up a factory there.

By 1799, the worst was over. With the death of Tipu Sultan, some of the battered Christian survivors returned but only to find that their wealth and properties were all gone. Some survivors did get back some of their land holdings or houses. Not all were that lucky. But nonetheless, they all had to start all over again. The task of rebuilding the church also began.

Under the Vijayanagar rulers, Gangolli had been a transit town for ships going further inland to Basrur. Trade was primarily with the Portuguese and the Arabs of Muscat. Horses, dates came inland in exchange for rice, pepper and kitchen vessels primarily of copper. By 1680 Gangolli had lost out to Mangalore as a preferred trading port due to the fact that even large seafaring vessels could go into the broad and up to 17-fathom-deep Netravali River and load rice. 
During the British administration, Gangolli grew into an important commerce and export centre with business connections to Bombay, Kerala, Gujarat, the Middle East, Lakshadweep and Tanzania. The main exports were Rice, jaggery and coconut.

After Indian independence in 1948, the village continued to be a trading centre, but trading activities suffered due to the construction of National Highway 17 (India) or NH-17 (recently renumbered as NH-66) and the introduction of modern transport systems, replacing shipping.

Fr Paul D.G. Rego started the Labour School on 1 October 1949. Fr Michael Noronha constructed St Joseph Primary and Stella Maris Girls’ High School.  Fr Thomas D’Sa constructed the new school building at Kannada Kudru.  Fr Felix Noronha did the renovation of the school building in December 2001.  A new school building was constructed and computer education was started at the elementary school.

From the 1980s it developed as a major fishing centre with the introduction of mechanised fishing. It has now become the second largest bunder in Karnataka. Presently more than 200 boats are moored here.

Economy
Gangolli village has a harbour, and fishing is a major economic activity of Gangolli, as in the rest of Udupi district.

Language
The main languages used here are Kannada, Nawayath, and Konkani.

References 

Villages in Udupi district